Howell Interlocking Historic District is the area in West Midtown, Atlanta where four railroad lines converge. 
 It is adjacent to the Marietta Street Artery neighborhood, an area rich in industrial history, as an original industrial district built along Atlanta's first railway line (1837).

See also
 Southern Railway North Avenue Yards Historic District

References

External links
 "Howell Interlocking Historic District" Marietta Street Artery Association

Historic districts in Atlanta
Rail yards in Georgia (U.S. state)
Historic districts on the National Register of Historic Places in Georgia (U.S. state)
National Register of Historic Places in Atlanta
Rail infrastructure on the National Register of Historic Places in Georgia (U.S. state)